Anet is a commune in France. 

Anet, or ANET, may also refer to:

 Canadian-born singer/songwriter Annette Ducharme
 Game developer ArenaNet (commonly shortened to ANet)
 Airliners.net, aviation website and discussion forum
 Air Nippon Network (commonly shortened to A-net)
 Ancient Near Eastern Texts Relating to the Old Testament (ANET)
Arista Networks on the New York Stock Exchange (ticker symbol ANET)

People with the surname
 Bobby Anet, American basketball player
 Jean-Baptiste Anet (1676–1755), French violinist

See also

Ant (name)
Anett, a feminine given name
Annette (disambiguation)